Asura gigantea is a moth of the family Erebidae. It was described by Lars Kühne in 2007. It is found in Burundi.

References

Moths described in 2007
gigantea
Moths of Africa